Belozerovo is a rural locality (a village) in Tregubovskoye Rural Settlement, Velikoustyugsky District, Vologda Oblast, Russia. The population was 119 as of 2002.

Geography 
The distance to Veliky Ustyug is 13.5 km, to Morozovitsa is 7.7 km. Barsukovo is the nearest rural locality.

References 

Rural localities in Velikoustyugsky District